The Newron Sports Cup is an inline hockey club championship trophy, awarded annually to the Major League Roller Hockey (MLRH) playoffs champion.

The Newron Sports Cup is the oldest professional inline hockey trophy in North America. Originally inscribed the Jason Cup, the trophy was first awarded during the 1998 season, named after a child with a life-threatening illness. During the 2002 season, the Elite Sports Group paid for the rights to the name of the cup, and it was renamed to the Elite Sports Group Cup. In 2009 Newron Sports bought the rights to the cup renaming it to the Newron Sports Cup.

Sports trophies and awards